An identity disturbance is a deficiency or inability to maintain one or more major components of identity. These components include a sense of continuity over time; emotional commitment to representations of self, role relationships, core values and self-standards; development of a meaningful world view; and recognition of one's place in the world.

It appears to be linked to emotional dysregulation, which has been shown to be a significant predictor of identity disturbance in psychiatric patients even when controlling for borderline personality disorder diagnosis, depression, and anxiety. Although some researchers posit that it is the lack of consistent goals, values, world views, and relationships that lead to a sense of emptiness, it is not entirely clear whether the link between emotional dysregulation and identity disturbance is because a disturbed identity creates a negative affect that is hard to regulate, because emotional dysregulation disturbs identity, because a third variable causes both (confounding), or some combination of the above.

Correlation with BPD

There are many theories about why borderline personality disorder often includes identity disturbances. One is that patients with BPD inhibit emotions, which causes numbness and emptiness. Another theory is that patients with BPD identify fully with the affective state of each moment, leaping from one moment to the next without the continuity of a narrative identity. Meeting criteria for major depressive disorder predicts identity disturbance in BPD patients, and identity disturbance is also correlated with a heightened risk for substance use disorders and high anxiety in adolescents. The syndrome of identity disturbance is encountered in all personality disorder types.

Neural substrate
To understand the development of self-identity, researchers investigating the neural basis of self have examined the neural systems involved in distinguishing one's own thoughts and actions from the thoughts and actions of others.

One critical system implicated in this line of research involves the cortical midline structures (CMS), which include the orbital and medial prefrontal cortex, the anterior cingulate cortex, dorsomedial prefrontal cortex, and the posterior cingulate cortex including the adjacent precuneus (see insert). Greater activation in these structures has been found when people made trait judgements about themselves as opposed to others, as well as during a resting state (see Default mode network) or self-referential activity compared to when involved in a non-self-referential task. In addition to this correlational evidence linking these regions to our self-identity, one study using transcranial magnetic stimulation to transiently disturb neural activity in the medial parietal region of cortex found that this disruption led to a decreased ability to retrieve previous judgements of oneself compared to the retrieval of previous judgements of others.

Based on evidence from neuroimaging studies in clinical populations, it seems that both high activity in CMS regions during resting state and self-referential activities, accompanied by deactivation of this region during non-self-referential tasks, are critical for forming a stable and unified identity. More pronounced identity disturbance seems to be facilitated by poorer deactivation of CMS during task-related activities. Activity has also been shown to be lower in the dorsal portion of the precuneus for people believed to have identity disturbance compared to controls during the evaluation of self-attributes.

Moreover, researchers comparing resting-state fMRI scans of people with BPD and health controls have found reduced functional connectivity in the retrosplenial cortex and the superior frontal gyrus.

Mindfulness training, a core skill in dialectical behavior therapy used in the treatment of BPD, has been linked with alterations in default mode network activity.

References

Emotional issues